Qikiqtani School Operations (QSO) is one of three Regional School Operations (RSO) in Nunavut, headquartered in Pond Inlet. The RSO includes 22 schools, including 5 elementary schools, 2 middle schools and 3 high schools.

The QSO is responsible for operating schools, various staff-related operations, programs and service supervision (under the direction of the Department of Education), relocation, curricula and educational program assistance and working with and supporting local District Education Authorities.

Schools

Elementary 
 Alookie School, Pangnirtung (K–5)
 Nakasuk School, Iqaluit (K–5)
 Joamie Ilinniarvik School, Iqaluit (K-5)
 Nanook Elementary School, Iqaluit-Apex (K–5)
 Nuiyak School, Sanikiluaq (K–6)
 Ulaajuk School, Pond Inlet (K–5)

Middle 
 Aqsarniit Ilinniarvik School, Iqaluit (6–8)

High 
 Ataguttaaluk High School, Igloolik (8–12)
 Inuksuk High School, Iqaluit (9–12)
 Nasivvik High School, Pond Inlet (6–12)

Other 
 Arnaqjuaq School, Sanirajak (K–12)
 Ataguttaaluk Elementary School, Igloolik (K–7)
 Attagoyuk School, Pangnirtung (6–12)
 Inuksuit School, Qikiqtarjuaq (K–12)
 Inuujaq School, Arctic Bay (K–12)
 Paatsaali School, Sanikiluaq (7–12)
 Peter Pitseolak School, Kinngait (8–12)
 Qaqqalik School, Kimmirut (K–12)
 Qarmartalik School, Resolute (K–12)
 Quluaq School, Clyde River (K–12)
 Sam Pudlat School, Kinngait (K–7)
 Umimmak School, Grise Fiord (K–12)

References 

School districts in Nunavut
Education in Nunavut